Hospitals and small medical centers and posts are found throughout the island of Madagascar, although they are concentrated in urban areas and particularly in Antananarivo. In addition to the high expense of medical care relative to the average Malagasy income, the prevalence of trained medical professionals remains extremely low.

The Human Rights Measurement Initiative finds that Madagascar is fulfilling 90.8% of what it should be fulfilling for the right to health based on its level of income. When looking at the right to health with respect to children, Madagascar achieves 99.0% of what is expected based on its current income. In regards to the right to health amongst the adult population, the country achieves 96.8% of what is expected based on the nation's level of income. Madagascar falls into the "bad" category when evaluating the right to reproductive health because the nation is fulfilling only 76.6% of what the nation is expected to achieve based on the resources (income) it has available.

Access to health care
Since most of the hospitals, health centers and health posts are located in urban areas, access to medical care remains beyond the reach of many.

Health situation
Health services have shown a trend toward improvement over the past twenty years. There has been improved access to drinking water, intense malaria pre-elimination efforts and they have started campaigns to improve children's health. Child immunizations against such diseases as hepatitis B, diphtheria and measles increased an average of 60% in this period, indicating low but increasing availability of basic medical services and treatments. The Malagasy fertility rate in 2009 was 4.6 children per woman, declining from 6.3 in 1990. Teen pregnancy rates of 14.8% in 2011, much higher than the African average, are a contributing factor to rapid population growth. In 2010 the maternal mortality rate was 440 per 100,000 births, compared to 373.1 in 2008 and 484.4 in 1990, indicating a decline in perinatal care following the 2009 coup. The infant mortality rate in 2011 was 41 per 1,000 births, with an under-five mortality rate at 61 per 1,000 births. Schistosomiasis, malaria and sexually transmitted diseases are common in Madagascar, although infection rates of AIDS remain low relative to many countries in mainland Africa, at only 0.2% of the adult population. The malaria mortality rate is also among the lowest in Africa at 8.5 deaths per 100,000 people, in part due to the highest frequency use of insecticide treated nets in Africa. Adult life expectancy in 2009 was 63 years for men and 67 years for women.

Malnutrition 
Madagscar has a malnutrition burden among its under-5 population. Numbers from 2013 shows us that the national prevalence of under-5 stunting is 48.9%, this is a lot higher than the developing country average which is 25%. Under-5 overweight has decreased from 6.2% in 2004 to 1.1% in 2013. Under-5 wasting national prevalence is 7.9%, which is less than the developing country average of 8.9%. Around 75,000 children under 5 years have been treated for severe acute malnutrition since 2015. 50,000 were emergency cases.

The adult population in Madagascar also face a malnutrition burden. 36.8% of Malagasy women of reproductive age have anaemia, and around 6.3% of adult Malagasy men suffers from diabetes.

Measles 
In 2018 a measles epidemic struck the island, with more than 117,000 people infected. Only 58% of people on the main island were vaccinated against measles. More than 1,200 people died, most of them children.  Malnutrition, which is widespread, increased the rate of fatalities.

References

See also
Malaria in Madagascar
List of hospitals in Madagascar